Sennott Park is a park at the intersection of Broadway and Norfolk Street in Cambridge, Massachusetts, United States.

References

External links
 
 Sennott Park at Find It Cambridge

Geography of Cambridge, Massachusetts
Parks in Massachusetts